Mircea Fulger (born 26 January 1959) is a retired light-welterweight boxer from Romania who won a bronze medal at the 1984 Olympics. He also won two national senior titles. Fulger retired in December 1984 to become a boxing coach and international referee.

References

External links

1959 births
Living people
People from Argeș County
Light-welterweight boxers
Olympic boxers of Romania
Boxers at the 1984 Summer Olympics
Olympic bronze medalists for Romania
Olympic medalists in boxing
Romanian male boxers
Medalists at the 1984 Summer Olympics
20th-century Romanian people